Nyceryx coffaeae is a moth of the  family Sphingidae. It is found from Mexico, Belize, Guatemala and Costa Rica into South America, where it is known from Brazil, Colombia, Ecuador and Bolivia.

The wingspan is 68–69 mm. It can be distinguished from all other Nyceryx species by the dark brown band dividing the yellow basal area of the hindwing upperside.

Adults are probably on wing year round.

The larvae feed on Calycophyllum candidissimum.

References

Nyceryx
Moths described in 1856